Roy Gokay Wol (born on February 13, 1984) is a Turkish-Israeli award winning film producer and director living in the United States. He is known for the film The Garden Left Behind starring Michael Madsen and Ed Asner; and directed the music video Try A Little Tenderness, starring Alice Tan Ridley.

Life and career
Roy Wol was born in Israel. Raised in Turkey and Canada, Wol was born as the son of an Argentine mother and a Turkish father. He moved to the US in 2009 and has been working on film since then. Roy is the founder of Studio Autonomous, and has produced several films including Art Machine, Tom in America and, Bikini Moon directed by Academy Award nominee Milcho Manchevski.

Most recently, he produced the 2019 SXSW winning feature film, The Garden Left Behind, directed by Flavio Alves. The Garden Left Behind was selected to the 2017 IFP Lab, and stars Ed Asner and Michael Madsen.  Roy has frequently collaborated with fellow producer and director Flavio Alves. In 2016 Wol and Alves pioneered the use of eBay as a crowdfunding platform. Their campaign raised over $100,000 through their website eBayMyFilm, and The Garden Left Behind  became the first independent film to be funded substantially through donations and sales via eBay.

Personal life 
Roy Wol lives in Brooklyn, New York, and is currently writing a book about independent film producing.

Filmography

Producer 
 2019: The Garden Left Behind
 2018: Bikini Moon
 2014: Tom in America
 2012: A Wife Alone
 2011: Art Machine
 2011: Arkadya
 2010: 57 Ways
 2008: Kill Your Television

References

External links 
 
eBay My Film official web site
The Garden Left Behind official web site
Art Machine official web site

1984 births
Living people
Israeli people of Turkish descent
Turkish film producers
Israeli film producers
Film people from Tel Aviv
Businesspeople from New York City